Musa W. Dube (born 28 July 1964), also known as Musa Wenkosi Dube Shomanah, is a Botswanan feminist theologian and Professor of New Testament at the Candler School of Theology, known for her work in postcolonial biblical scholarship.

Biography 
Dube studied New Testament in the University of Durham in 1990, before completed her PhD in New Testament at Vanderbilt University in 1997, where she was supervised under postcolonial biblical scholar Fernando Segovia. She was Professor of New Testament at the University of Botswana. Dube joined the faculty of Candler School of Theology in Fall 2021 as a Professor of New Testament. She has written over two hundred and sixty scholarly works throughout her academic career that focus on liberation theology through a feminist postcolonial lens. 

Dube is committed to approaching the biblical text from a feminist postcolonial lens. As a lay preacher in the Methodist church, Dube preaches a liberation theology which refuses to blame women for evil and offers new interpretations of scripture. Dube believes that Western perspectives on biblical writings are patriarchal which denies the truth of the gospel.

In 2011, Dube was a recipient of a Humboldt Prize, In 2017 she was the winner of the international Gutenberg Teaching Award. In 2018, she was awarded a Doctor of Theology honoris causa at Stellenbosch University, South Africa.

Research 
Dube's life experiences informed her academic interest in feminist post-colonial interpretations of scripture. In parts of San-Saharan Africa, Christianity is known as a distrusting religion introduced by colonizers and the cause of many injustices towards communities of color. Dube reintroduces the bible in a postcolonial lens that addresses the issue of colonization without denying the Bible. She acknowledges the paradox for African men and women when it comes to dealing with religion, politics, and ethics.

Works

References 

1964 births
Alumni of Durham University
Botswana theologians
Christian feminist biblical scholars
Christian feminist theologians
Living people
Religion academics
Academic staff of the University of Botswana
Vanderbilt University alumni
World Christianity scholars
Women Christian theologians